Northgate High School formerly Northgate High School and Dereham Sixth Form College is an academy situated in East Dereham, Norfolk, England. It is a co-educational comprehensive school, for ages 11–18. It is one of two high schools in the town.

The Executive Headteacher is Mr Glyn Hambling, who took up his post in September 2011, after former temporary Headteacher Paul Mitchell left in June 2011.

History
The school converted to academy status in September 2014. In October 2016 Northgate announced its intention to form a Multi-Academy Trust, called the Unity Academy Trust.
The Unity Academy Trust name was already in use elsewhere, therefore the trust was launched as the Unity Education Trust on 1 March 2017, comprising the following five establishments:

 Northgate High School & Dereham Sixth Form College
 Grove House Infant & Junior School
 Kings Park Infant School
 Beeston Primary School
 Garvestone Primary School

Curriculum
Virtually all maintained schools and academies follow the National Curriculum, and are inspected by Ofsted on how well they succeed in delivering a 'broad and balanced curriculum'. The school has to decide whether Key Stage 3 contains years 7, 8 and 9- or whether year 9 should be in Key Stage 4 and the students just study subjects that will be examined by the GCSE exams at 16. Northgate High School has a three-year Key Stage 3 but pupils start their Key Stage 4 options at the Easter of Year 9.

Key Stage 3- Key Stage 4

In 2019,  Key Stage 3 and 4 students studied:

Key Stage 5 - Sixth Form

Dereham Sixth Form College is a post-16 sixth form centre in the Norfolk town of Dereham, England. The centre is operated by Northgate High School, offering AS level, BTEC and A level courses.
From 1977 to 2016 the college was jointly managed and governed by the two high schools in Dereham, Neatherd and Northgate. Teaching was divided equally between both schools. 
Northgate High School, was awarded the college in July 2016 by Norfolk County Council following the declaration in February 2016 by the governing body of Dereham Neatherd High School that it desired to set up its own sixth form. Later, in the same month, Northgate announced that it was setting up a Multi Academy Trust with Dereham Sixth Form College.

Most teaching is carried out within the college site, with some classes taught at Northgate. Students at the college are on the roll of Northgate High School, and the results of the college are claimed by Northgate.

In January 2017 the college director announced her resignation.

Notable former pupils
Chris Rankin, actor, famous for role as Percy Weasley in the Harry Potter films
Bobby Copping
Chris Baker (high jumper),
Todd Cantwell, Norwich City footballer.

References

External links
School website
Sixth Form website

External links

Educational institutions with year of establishment missing
Dereham
Secondary schools in Norfolk
Sixth form colleges in Norfolk
Academies in Norfolk